This was the first edition of the tournament. Niels Desein won his maiden ATP Challenger Tour title, beating countryman Ruben Bemelmans 7–6(7–4), 2–6, 7–6(7–4)

Seeds

Draw

Finals

Top half

Bottom half

References
 Main Draw
 Qualifying Draw

Aegon GB Pro-Series Glasgow - Singles